North Branch, Queensland may refer to:
 North Branch, Queensland (Southern Downs Region) in Australia
 North Branch, Queensland (Toowoomba Region) in Australia